Laurent Henkinet (born 14 September 1992) is a Belgian footballer who is playing for Standard Liège as a goalkeeper in the Belgian First Division A.

External links

1992 births
Living people
Belgian footballers
Association football goalkeepers
K.S.K. Tongeren players
Sint-Truidense V.V. players
Standard Liège players
K.F.C. Dessel Sport players
K.V. Kortrijk players
S.K. Beveren players
Oud-Heverlee Leuven players
Belgian Pro League players
Challenger Pro League players
Footballers from Liège